The Vernon Vipers are a junior "A" ice hockey team based in Vernon, British Columbia, Canada. They are members of the Interior Conference of the British Columbia Hockey League (BCHL). They play their home games at Kal Tire Place.

History
The Vernon Jr. Canadians, Penticton Jr. Vees, Kelowna Buckaroos and Kamloops Rockets, four junior "B" teams, formed the Okanagan-Mainline Junior Hockey League in 1961 on the advice and determination of Canadians owner Bill Brown.

After their inaugural season the Canadians changed their name to "Vernon Blades" and kept that name until the start of the 1967–68 season.

In the playoffs of 1970 the "Vernon Essos", as they were called, captured the league championship and Mowat Cup (BC). They also automatically advanced to the Abbott Cup (Western Canada) because the AJHL champions did not want to contest for the BC/Alta Championship (now called the Doyle Cup). In the 1970 Abbott Cup, the Weyburn Red Wings of the Saskatchewan Junior Hockey League defeated Vernon 4 games to none.

The Essos repeated as league champions and Mowat Cup winners in 1972, only to lose to the Red Deer Rustlers for the BC/Alta Championship, 4 games to 2.

For the start of the 1973–74 season the Vernon Essos became the Vernon Vikings. They remained the Vikings until the end of the 1977–78 season.  The team took a leave of absence for the 1979–80 season.

In the 1980–81 season, as the Vernon Lakers, the team only won 8 games out of the 56 played. They next season, they won only 10 of 47 games. It was not until the 1982–83 season that Lakers began to gradually improve. In the 1988 playoffs, the team made it to the Doyle Cup. In 1989, the Lakers started the first of four consecutive trips to the National Championships, which saw them win two Centennial Cups (1990 and 1991), three Abbott Cups, three Doyle Cups, four Mowat Cups, four league championships, and five conference championships.

In the 1990 Centennial Cup final, Vernon (as host) faced the heavily favored New Westminster Royals, who had previously defeated Vernon in the league finals. It was the first televised Centennial Cup Final. The game had New Westminster take the lead into the third period, 5–3 before Cam Sylven tied the game for the Lakers, 5–5, in the third period to force overtime. He scored once again in overtime on a breakaway for the 6–5 win and the first of two Centennial Cups for the Lakers.

The Lakers repeated as Centennial Cup winners in 1991 defeating the Sudbury Cubs of the Northern Ontario Junior Hockey League, 8–4. They also contested for the national finals in 1992, but lost in the semifinals to the Winkler Flyers of the Saskatchewan Junior Hockey League, 5–2.

The Vernon franchise would not return to the national tournament for another four years. In 1996, the team had rebranded as the Vernon Vipers and the trophy was the inaugural Royal Bank Cup. It was one of Vernon's best seasons as they finished the regular season with a 43–13–4 record. The Vipers defeated the Langley Thunder for the league title, four games to one, before defeating the Prince George Spruce Kings (Rocky Mountain Junior Hockey League) for the Mowat Cup, three games to none. They then faced the Saint Albert Saints (Alberta Junior Hockey League) team winning four games to three to claim the Doyle Cup.The Abbott Cup, which was now awarded during the Royal Bank Cup round-robin play, was given to Melfort Mustangs (Saskatchewan Junior Hockey League) as they defeated Vipers, 5–1. The Vipers had an even round-robin, winning two games and losing two. The Newmarket 87's of the Ontario Provincial Junior A Hockey League were the Vipers' next opponent in the semifinals, which they won, 7–4. In the final, the met the host Melfort Mustangs, avenging their lose in the semifinals, winning by a score of 2–0.

Three years after winning the inaugural Royal Bank Cup, Vernon won another in 1999. The Vipers finished the season with a 52–6–2 record, then went on to defeat the Chilliwack Chiefs for the league title, the Fred Page Cup. They won the Mowat Cup over the Kimberley Dynamiters (RMJHL) four games to one, but it was the first time a team from the Rocky Mountain Junior Hockey League defeated a team from the BCHL. The Doyle Cup was also won by Vernon, four games to one, over the Calgary Canucks (AJHL). The Vipers struggled in the Royal Bank Cup tournament, winning only once during round-robin play, but was enough to claim the Abbott Cup by defeating the Estevan Bruins (SJHL), 3–2. Vernon still managed to advance to the semifinals based on the one win and in that semifinals, the Bramalea Blues (OPJHL) were defeated by a score of 3–2. The Vipers then defeated the Charlottetown Abbies (Maritime Junior A Hockey League), 9–3, claiming the franchise's fourth national championship in ten years. The 1999 Viper team was inducted in the British Columbia Hockey Hall of Fame in 2016.

In the 2000–01 season, the Vernon Vipers failed to make the playoffs, the first time since 1982.

In 2009, the Vipers swept through the league playoffs, defeating the Penticton Vees four games to one, the Salmon Arm Silverbacks four games to two and the Powell River Kings four games to two, for the league championship. The Vernon Vipers then swept the regional and national series with ten straight wins and no losses. They defeated the Grande Prairie Storm for the Doyle Cup, and in the Royal Bank Cup Tournament they defeated all teams in the round-robin: the Kingston Voyageurs, 6–3, in the semifinal and the Humboldt Broncos, 2–0, in the final, winning the franchise's fifth national title and third Royal Bank Cup. With five national titles, Vernon is the only junior A franchise to have that distinction.

In 2010, the Vipers were league and divisional winners with 105 points, second all-time for the franchise, finishing with a league record of 51–6–0–3. Having avoided the elimination round, the Vipers met up with the fifth place Quesnel Millionaires in the quarterfinals, defeating them four games to two. The Penticton Vees were the Vipers' next opponent in the semifinals, also defeated by a result of four games to two. In the BCHL finals, the Vipers once again took on the Powell River Kings. The Kings took Vernon to a game seven, which the Vipers won by a score of 3–1, advancing to the Doyle Cup. The Doyle Cup series also went to seven games against the Spruce Grove Saints, with Vernon winning 7–3. The 2010 National Junior A Tournament was held in Dauphin, Manitoba. The Vernon Vipers record in the round-robin was 3–1 and advanced to the semifinal against the Brockville Braves, winning 2–0. In the final against the host team, the Dauphin Kings, the Vipers won 8–1, giving the Vernon Vipers their fourth Royal Bank Cup and sixth national championship for Vernon. The Vipers were the third team that had won back-to-back national championships, the previous two being in 1981 and 1982 Prince Albert Raiders and the 1990 and 1991 Vernon Lakers.

The Vernon Vipers fourth national title tied them with the Prince Albert Raiders, although it is the sixth for the franchise, a new Canadian record. In 2014, the Vipers were once again in the national tournament, as hosts,  setting a record of ten appearances.

Season-by-season history

Notable alumni

Alumni who played in the National Hockey League

Other notable alumni 
Justin Bourne
Brad Farynuk
Garrett Festerling
Curtis Fraser
Bryan McGregor

See also
List of ice hockey teams in British Columbia

References

External links 
Official website of the Vipers Website
Official website of the BCHL
Fan site - Vernon Jr A Hockey History

Sport in Vernon, British Columbia
British Columbia Hockey League teams
Ice hockey teams in British Columbia
1961 establishments in British Columbia
Ice hockey clubs established in 1961